, also known as , were the original male geisha of Japan.

History
They were sounding boards for military strategies and they battled at the side of their lord.

("Laughs to Banish Sleep"), a collection of comic stories written by Sakuden Anrakuan, was compiled during this time.

"Geisha" means "arts person", while  was the formal name for "jester".  was a less formal name for these men, which literally means "drum bearer", though not all of them used the drum. It could also have been a corrupted way of saying "to flatter someone". These three terms came into use during the 17th century. In 1751 the first  (female geisha) arrived at a party and caused quite a stir. She was called  ("arts girl"), which is still the term for geisha in Kyoto today. The geisha even took over from the  due to their artistic skills, their contemporary outlook and their sophistication. The men continued to assist the women – this time the geisha – in the entertainment field.

Decline
In Geisha: The Secret History of a Vanishing World, Lesley Downer wrote that in Yoshiwara in 1770, there were 16 female geisha and 31 male geisha. In 1775 there were 33 female geisha, but still 31 male geisha. But in 1800 there were 143 female geisha and 45 male geisha. The females started to take over the field and the role of the males was again changed – this time the males took on the role of supporting the women at parties.

There were between five or six hundred  in Japan during the peak of their popularity. Their decline sped up with World War II, and the  continue to decline today. Although there are still small communities of geisha in Kyoto and Tokyo, there are only eight  in Japan. Four  are in Tokyo, one is in Kyoto.

Shichiko
She calls  the party masters who ensure that the guests have a fun time at the party by telling jokes, telling erotic tales and acting out skits, playing games and drinking . These parties, like with geisha, can be very expensive. Shichiko joked that  – that a man who spends all of his time and money on  will fall into ruin and his wife will kick him out, and he will have nothing left to do but become a  himself. Apparently this is why a lot of men became  in earlier times.

As part of his repertoire, Ms. Downer was shocked by one particular skit – one that is a classic erotic skit. The  pretends to be talking to a pretend  (patron) who obviously wants to have sex. The  explains that he is not homosexual, and that he is called a geisha, but the pretend  is impatient. So the  gives in to please the client, and acts out (half hidden by a screen) the sex with moans and rolling of eyes, until the climax. The  then gets a tissue to 'clean up'. The audience roared with laughter because they all knew that this was a joke, making fun of how geisha and  please their customers.

Arai
The Kyoto , Taikomochi Arai, wants to promote this traditional art both in Japan and around the world. He tells sophisticated erotic stories and is well versed in performing arts for the parties, keeping the party lively and fun for the guests. This sort of entertainment is grounded in the fertility related banquet linked with the agriculture of ancient Japan.
	
He also gives lectures at the Asahi Culture Centers in Osaka and Kobe, writes newspaper columns and has his own radio show about Japan's traditional entertainment culture. He has also published a book,  ("The Essence of Timing in Performing Arts"). He was involved with giving advice for the  character in the movie . He comments:

References
Geisha:The Secret History of a Vanishing World, Downer, Lesley, 2001, Headline,

External links
 Taikomochi or Houkan, the Male Counterpart to the Geisha (Original source of this entry)
Taikomochi Arai home page

Japanese culture
Japanese prostitutes
Types of geisha
Male prostitutes by type
Japanese male prostitutes